Kentucky Correctional Institution for Women (KCIW) is a prison located in unincorporated Shelby County, Kentucky, near Pewee Valley, Kentucky, operated by the Kentucky Department of Corrections.  Male and female inmates prior to 1937 had been housed at the Kentucky State Penitentiary in Frankfort (1912 name changed Kentucky State Reformatory in Frankfort.)

Pine Bluff Prison Farm
A home for girls had been established in Shelby County, Kentucky by an Act 1916 in Pine Bluff, Kentucky It was maintained by the State.   After WWI lack of funding caused the project to be abandoned.  This facility had been established by the Kentucky Federation of Women's Clubs.   The State named this facility the Pine Bluff Prison Farm and the dedication was held November 4, 1938.
Beginning of construction:  November 1937 saw work starting on Kentucky's first prison for women at Pine Bluff on the 280-acre tract that had been deeded to the State by the Federation of Women's Clubs of Kentucky. The buildings also included an infirmary and administration building.  Since the January flood there was approximately 100 women convicts quartered in an old school building in Frankfort. The new prison would provide instruction in arts, crafts, needlework and domestic science.

End of November 1937 – Work started on new Kentucky State women's prison to cost $130,000.

Superintendents

1964

Legislation to change name
H.B. 367 – E. G. Brown.  Amending K.R.S. 197.010 to define "penitentiaries" to include the State penal institutions for males at Eddyville and LaGrange, the institution for women located in Shelby County, together with the branches thereof and any other similar institutions hereafter established:  changing the name of the institution for women to "The Kentucky Correctional Institution for Women"; requiring a female superintendent be appointed and listing required qualifications.

The name of Kentucky's female prison officially changed June 18, 1964.  Prior to that date it had been a branch of the Kentucky State Reformatory in LaGrange, Kentucky.

Accreditation
1983 The third Kentucky prison to receive accreditation by the American Correctional Association standards.

August 16, 2005
Otter Creek Correctional Complex in Wheelwright, Kentucky a private prison was leased by the state to help with the overcrowding conditions of the Kentucky Correctional Institution of Kentucky in Peewee Valley, Kentucky.

Until the 2010 conversion of the Western Kentucky Correctional Complex into a women's prison, KCIW was the only state owned and operated women's prison in Kentucky. The prison continues to house all levels of inmates including all female death row inmates. It opened in 1938 and had a prison population of 721 as of 2007.

Sexual misconduct 
There have been several reports and convictions of correctional officers in the prison sexually abusing and assaulting inmates, including James Johnson, Demar Jones, and Shane Fisher. The institute has more male employees than females.

Female correctional officers have also reports harassment by male coworkers. Corrections employees make up about 15% of all Kentucky state employees, but they make nearly 50% of all state sexual harassment complaints.

Notable inmates
 Amy Bosley – Sentenced to 20 years in prison in Kentucky for the murder of her husband on May 17, 2005.
 Virginia Caudill – Caudill was convicted of the 1998 death of a 73-year-old female and sentenced to death.
 LaFonda Faye Foster – Convicted of killing several people in Lexington on a spree one night. Sentenced to death, but this sentence was overturned to life without parole.
 Shayna Hubers – Convicted of murdering her boyfriend Ryan Poston.
 Tina Powell – Convicted of murders in Lexington, sentenced to life.

References

External links

Kentucky Correctional Institution for Women
History and Overview

Prisons in Kentucky
Women's prisons in Kentucky
Capital punishment in Kentucky
Buildings and structures in Shelby County, Kentucky
1938 establishments in Kentucky